Bas-Lag is the fictional world in which several of English author China Miéville's novels are set. Bas-Lag is a world where both magic (referred to as "thaumaturgy") and steampunk technology exist, and is home to many intelligent races. It is influenced by the themes and tropes of multiple genres of science fiction, fantasy, and horror.

Novels
So far there have been three novels set in Bas-Lag. They are:
Perdido Street Station
The Scar
Iron Council

Additionally, the short story "Jack", featured in the 2005 collection Looking for Jake, is a Bas-Lag story.

Geography
Bas-Lag possesses a number of continents. Two landmasses, Rohagi and Bered Kai Nev, are named in the three novels, though numerous other landmasses and unique structures play important roles.

Rohagi
The exact proportions and geography of Rohagi are unknown. New Crobuzon lies about ten miles (16 km) inland from its eastern coast, which borders the Swollen Ocean. Immediately south of New Crobuzon is the Rudewood, beyond which lies the Mendican Hills. North of New Crobuzon, along the coast but separated by the Bezhek Mountains, are the ruins of Suroch. To the west, about a thousand miles from New Crobuzon and far beyond the Dancing Shoe Mountains, lies the four-hundred mile wide freshwater lake called Cold Claw Loch. The Loch connects with the vast, inland Cold Claw Sea, eight hundred miles to the north, via a natural channel called Cold Claw Sound. The Cold Claw Sea is talon-shaped, stretching eastward a great distance, almost connecting with the Swollen Ocean before curving southward for about two hundred miles, finally ending about seven hundred miles north of New Crobuzon. This southward curve is the Gengris, and is populated by the dangerous and unpredictable grindylow.

Cobsea lies inland and borders the Cacotopic Stain, a large wasteland created by the unreliable magical energy known as Torque. Myrshock lies on the northern coast of the Meagre Sea. As revealed in Iron Council, a wealthy industrialist had attempted to build a transcontinental railway that would link New Crobuzon with Cobsea and Myrshock, as the two states are trading partners, but was unsuccessful in this endeavor. However, the end of Iron Council indicates a second attempt at the project, using information gathered by the industrialist's agents throughout the course of the book.

South of the Meagre Sea is the Cymek Desert, which is home to the nomadic garudas. The Cymek also contains the northern port city of Shankell, which is known for its brutal gladiatorial combat, and the southern city of Dreer Samheer, both of which are predominantly populated by the cactacae.

West of the Cymek Desert lies the Galaggi Veldt, which is home to Tesh, which is neighboured by the Witchocracy, which goes to war with it against New Crobuzon in Iron Council. Tesh controls the Fire Water Straits, which lead to an as yet unidentified inland body of water that borders the Swollen Ocean. The control of the Fire Water Straits has resulted in a war between New Crobuzon and Tesh and the results of this war is a plot point in Iron Council. Crobuzine victory in this conflict is implied following the failure of the Teshi thaumaturgical attack upon the city. The Firewater Straits are renamed the Sanguine Straits during the course of the war, due to the ferocity and cost of the naval battles to control them.

Bered Kai Nev
Bered Kai Nev is a continent that lies to the east of Rohagi. The khepri are believed to be native to this continent, but were driven out by an event known only as The Ravening, and now live as refugees in various cities in Rohagi, although primitive khepri are rumored to still inhabit Bered Kai Nev. No other information regarding this continent has been provided.

Islands and other landmasses
The island is known for its scholarly reputation and the knowledge that its capital city, Kohnid, has. Some of this knowledge is derived from a colony of anophelii that they maintain. This colony is the only known remnants of what was known as the Malarial Queendom, a brutal regime that was active in most areas of Bas-Lag that had a warm climate.

The Jheshull Islands are a small trio of islands that lie off the coast of Rohagi. They were involved in the Pirate Wars and are considered to be on the decline due to their involvement against New Crobuzon.

Nova Esperium is one of New Crobuzon's colonies. Very few people choose to go to Nova Esperium of their own volition, as the long journey to the colony, combined with the rampant disease and other threats make it a harsh place to live, but New Crobuzon's government will pay the passage of any volunteers. The exact location of Nova Esperium is not given, although it lies a great distance across the Swollen Sea, southeast of New Crobuzon.

Armada
The pirate city of Armada is a mobile city-state, consisting of numerous ships that have been lashed together to form a large, connected settlement. It is divided into small districts which are ruled by a number of unique rulers, such as a High Cromlech vampir. Armada moves around the Swollen Ocean by means of a small fleet of tug ships and is the central setting of The Scar. Armada's origins are unknown, but it has existed in one form or another for at least a thousand years. At the opening of The Scar, its population is said to number in the hundreds of thousands. The city itself is only about a mile wide, though one character claims that "there are probably as many miles of streets here as in New Crobuzon" owing to all its "layers and layers of decks." In The Scar, Armada is seen and described through the eyes of several recently press-ganged citizens, notably New Crobuzoner Bellis Coldwine and Remade prisoner Tanner Sack.

The city's population is at least a hundred thousand, and is made up of humans, cactacae, khepri, ab-dead, Remade, scabmettlers and many other races. People considered criminals (or otherwise being of lower classes) in their former home states of Bas-Lag are recast as equals upon joining Armada, and often go on to hold positions of power.

Armada thrives on piracy, and through this method adds wealth to itself. Piracy of the seas also leads to acquisitions of knowledge in countless languages (all books are stolen for the Grand Gears Library), and the growth of Armada's population, for any ship intercepted by Armada's forces is assimilated into the city and its crew and passengers are press-ganged into citizenship for life. The language of Armada is Salt, a constructed language deliberately made easy to learn, and consisting of vocabulary from the languages of the many races who inhabit the city.

In the course of the events of The Scar, the Lovers devise of and carry out a plan to raise the legendary avanc to give Armada ultimate power over the seas. This has been tried once before in Armada's history, as evidenced by five enormous chains attached to the undersides of the city's largest ships. Along with a team of scientists and engineers, and against the voices of several of the other ridings, Garwater is able to summon the avanc using a great deal of physical and magical energy. This gives Armada the means to travel to the mythical "Scar".

Its ridings are:
Garwater: The most powerful of the ridings, led by the Lovers, two nameless scar-covered pirates who influence most of Armada's decisions. Garwater's flagship is The Grand Easterly. It is also in possession of two enormous airships, the Arrogance and the Trident, as well as the stolen New Crobuzon deep-sea rig Sorghum.
Dry Fall: Governed by a vampir called the Brucolac, Dry Fall's residents are prosperous and have the most security and individual freedoms of any of the ridings in Armada, but they pay for this way of life through a "goretax" - they donate their own blood to their vampiric leader. Dry Fall, along with Curhouse, stands against Garwater's plans to raise the avanc. Dry Fall's flagship is the Uroc.
Booktown: Run by a khepri triumvirate. Booktown houses the Grand Gears Library, Armada's immense stronghold of knowledge.
Curhouse: Curhouse is the most democratic of the ridings, and is governed by a large Council, who tend to oppose the Lovers. Curhouse is where Bellis Coldwine's ship the Terpsichoria ends up, and it is also the location of Croom Park, a large public garden spread over several ships that have been gutted and filled with soil.
Thee-and-Thine: This riding is led by a trader-king named Friedrich, whose favour is easily bought by the Lovers. It is regarded as a lawless slum-like neighbourhood by the greater populace of Armada, but Bellis observes that it is more mercantile than lawless. The flagship is the Salt Godling.
Bask: Bask's flagship is the Tailor's Moan. It is home to the menfish.
Jhour: This riding is led by a Cactacae queen named Braginod. Its flagship is the Saskital.
Shaddler: This riding is governed by a general, and is home to the majority of the Scabmettler population. Its flagship is the Therianthropus.
The Haunted Quarter: A deserted riding of ancient ships, believed to be inhabited by all manner of ghouls and other supernatural beings. It was used as a hideout for Silas Fennec.

History

Ghosthead Empire
Over three thousand years before the events of The Scar, powerful entities from another plane of existence ruled all of Bas-Lag for a period of 500 years. The Ghosthead, as these entities were known, originated on another world in a different plane of existence somewhere on the eastern rim of the universe. Seeking a milder place to live than their homeworld, which was torn between a vicious cycle of days and nights that created oceans of molten iron and froze the very atmosphere, the Ghosthead built a "metal fish" and used it to find Bas-Lag. Their arrival created The Scar, a massive physical and dimensional rift on Bas-Lag's surface from which different existential possibilities leak. The Ghosthead harnessed the energy from The Scar with a process called "possibility mining", and used their power to gain control over all of Bas-Lag, manipulating possibilities to their advantage. The Ghosthead Empire was ultimately destroyed by a rebellion called the Contumancy, followed by a period known as the Sloughing-Off. The Empire's history survives long after its fall in documents such as the Imperial Canon, and in lost technologies and structures, like Possible Swords and Possible Towers, still scattered in hidden places across Bas-Lag.

Malarial Queendom
The Malarial Queendom was a short-lived empire built by the anophelii, with territory in Rohagi, Shoteka, and the Shards. Some two thousand years before The Scar, the Queendom collapsed and the anophelii were nearly eradicated. The remaining anophelii were driven to a small island south of Gnurr Kett, where they are kept in isolation as captive scholars for the Gnurr Kett nobility.

First Umbric Age
The time period in which the Bas-Lag novels are set, the First Umbric Age, is the period of infighting and feuding that occurred between the various states on Rohagi after the Ghosthead Empire departed. The calendar used by New Crobuzon (at least) marks its years from the start of the First Umbric Age.

Full Years
The Full Years were New Crobuzon's golden age, when the city had achieved its greatest advances in science, technology, and thaumaturgy. Decline set in during the late 15th century, however, and some of this knowledge was lost. Desperate to prove that the golden age was not at an end, New Crobuzon constructed a massive ship, the largest in the world at that time, intended to be the pinnacle of New Crobuzon industry. The Grand Easterly was a boondoggle, however, suffering from several design flaws. It was briefly converted into an ineffectual warship during the Pirate Wars, and ended up quietly "sinking" a few years later; unbeknownst to New Crobuzon, the ship was captured by Armada.

Pirate Wars
Also known as the "Slow War" and the "False War", the Pirate Wars were a protracted conflict between the City-State Republic of New Crobuzon and the cities of Suroch and Jheshull. The Wars technically ended in the year 1544 when the New Crobuzon militia dropped Torque bombs on Suroch with horrific results. In 1545, New Crobuzon attempted to cover up the atrocities created by the Torque bombs and dropped colourbombs on Suroch's ruins, but two colourbombs misfired; the third detonated as planned, obliterating only a few square miles of what was left of Suroch. When heliographs of the destruction and Torque effects were taken by a militia research team and leaked to the New Crobuzon public a century later, widespread riots would almost bring down the government in 1689. Research into Torque is permanently stalled when the financiers back out, cowed by the public's vehement abhorrence.

The Ravening
Around the year 1679 (approx. one century before the events of Perdido Street Station), khepri civilization in Bered Kai Nev was wiped out by a disaster described only as "The Ravening". Khepri refugee ships would arrive at New Crobuzon for the next 25 years, the "Tragic Crossing". The Ravening was such a traumatizing event that nearly all khepri survivors had forgotten or even refused to relate ten-thousand years of khepri history; as a consequence, most khepri culture is lost forever.

1779–1780
The events of Perdido Street Station occur at this time, followed several months later by the events of The Scar.

1804
The events of Iron Council occur at this time.

Politics and society

Known states
 The Brothers  In Iron Council, The Brothers is said to lie on the western side of Rohagi, beyond the Cacotopic Stain. It is referred to as the "crocodile double-city."

 Gharcheltist  In Iron Council, Gharcheltist is referred to as "the aquapolis", and is presumably a vodyanoi city.

 The Gengris  The phrase "The Gengris" can refer to both a location and the aquatic grindylow race who inhabit it. The Gengris is described as a cross between an island and a half-sunken city lying at the jagged southern tip of the Cold Claw Sea, some seven hundred miles due north of New Crobuzon. Little else is known about the city itself, except that it is home to "malachite chapels", "limb-farms", and "bile workshops". The grindylow of The Gengris willingly trade with outsiders, handsomely rewarding traders for such oddities as barrels full of equal parts salt and glass beads, but frequently eliminate outsiders who have "transgressed" in some way; the nature of these transgressions are usually opaque to all but the grindylow themselves, and such trade is extremely risky for outsiders.

 Hell  Maintains an embassy in New Crobuzon.

 High Cromlech  Almost everything that is currently known about High Cromlech is derived from Uther Doul, one of the primary characters in The Scar. Doul was born and raised in High Cromlech. He describes it as a caste-based nation ruled by undead nobility, called "thanati." These he describes as "liches with sewn-shut mouths, with beautiful clothes and skin like preserved leather."

The living (called "the quick") are a minority in High Cromlech. Most are apparently bred and raised on "farms", and are eventually "snuffed and recast as zombies." Some are reared by the thanati, to be "slain and welcomed to dead society" once they come of age. A small fraction of the living are born free, however, and these survive by doing work that is too skilled (or too dangerous) for semi-sentient zombies. Zombies would seem to be High Cromlech's primary workforce.

At the bottom of High Cromlech's social ladder are the "vampir", which are referred to as "ab-dead" to distinguish them from the thanati. Based on Doul's description, the vampir are apparently considered little more than vagrants and addicts. He depicts them as living in  shanty towns, coming out at night to beg the living for blood.

 Khadoh  Khadoh's merchants trade with New Crobuzon.

 Maru'ahm  Maru'ahm is apparently found on the western side of the Rohagi continent, beyond the Cacotopic Stain. In Perdido Street Station, it is said to be ruled by a casino-parliament, "where laws were stakes in games of roulette." This rumor is affirmed in Iron Council, where a character who visited Maru'ahm claims he played for such stakes as property laws and "a whole pot of legislation." This same character mentions a queen and "cardsharp senators", implying that Maru'ahm's government is some form of constitutional or elective monarchy.

 New Crobuzon  The city-state of New Crobuzon is a major plot device for all three of the Bas-Lag novels, and a substantial part of the Bas-Lag setting. It is situated at the confluence of the Rivers Tar, Canker and Gross Tar, about ten miles (16 km) west of the Swollen Ocean. Though a self-styled parliamentary republic, New Crobuzon's government more closely resembles an oligarchy with strong imperialistic ambitions. The political system of New Crobuzon is hugely biased towards the human majority and only those ranked higher in society, along with a few others elected in a "suffrage lottery" are allowed to vote. The "Fat Sun" party rules in all the Bas-Lag novels, but other political parties include the xenophobic "New Quill" (called "Three Quills" in Perdido Street Station) and the xenotolerant "Diverse Tendency"

 The protagonist in The Scar calls New Crobuzon the greatest city in Bas-Lag, but her opinion is substantially biased. Nevertheless, New Crobuzon is certainly one of Bas-Lag's most economically and militarily powerful states. In The Scar, it is capable of dispatching a fleet halfway around the world to combat the pirate-city of Armada. In Iron Council, it carries out a protracted war with the distant city-state of Tesh, and crushes an internal rebellion through force of arms.

 Qé Banssa  Qé Banssa is built upon the sloping peaks of Dancing Bird Island. It is called a "poor, ugly little fishing port" by a protagonist in The Scar. As with Tarmuth, Qé Banssa seems to survive by dint of New Crobuzon's good will.

 Salkrikaltor  The Cray Commonwealth of Salkrikaltor is found beneath the waves of the Swollen Ocean, far east of New Crobuzon between the islands Bartoll and Gnomon Tor. Salkrikaltor and New Crobuzon are described in The Scar as being trading partners on amiable terms.

 The capital of the Commonwealth is Salkrikaltor City. Most of Salkrikaltor City is located underwater, though there is a "topside" district for non-aquatic creatures that seek to do business with the cray. The submerged part of the City is described in The Scar as "convoluted and interconnected", with "little squares of seaweed topiary" and "coral courtyards." The above-water district is described as consisting mostly of towers carved from rock and coral, "a mass of contrary styles", with floating platforms and buildings suspended by struts and columns.

 Suroch  Suroch was a city which fought and eventually lost a series of wars against New Crobuzon known in the latter as the Pirate Wars.  Throughout the time period covered by the plots of the Bas-Lag novels, Suroch has already been destroyed and rendered uninhabitable by the effects of magical weapons of mass destruction, the "colourbomb" and devices making use of the Torque.

Suroch is the only place in the novels with a Torque contamination similar to that of the Cacotopic Stain, though Torque storms are said to appear randomly. Mentions have been made – especially in Perdido Street Station – of "Cockroach Trees" in Suroch and "Herds of what might once have been human". The publishing of heliotypes of the Torque contamination in the illicit Sacramundi report put an end to Torque experiments in New Crobuzon.

 Tarmuth  Tarmuth is situated at the mouth of the Gross Tar River, on the coast of the Rohagi continent about ten miles (16 km) east of New Crobuzon. The protagonist in The Scar describes it as "an ugly, violent town" used by privateers and freebooters as safe harbor. Besides "prostitution and piracy", Tarmuth survives by manufacturing ships, and exists thanks to New Crobuzon's patronage.

 Troglodopolis  Troglodopolis is referred to in Perdido Street Station as a "chthonic burrow."

 Vadaunk  Vadaunk lies somewhere south of New Crobuzon, beyond the Cacotopic Stain. According to government propaganda in Perdido Street Station, the changing seasons "bring an onslaught of superstitious repression" there. In Iron Council it is called "the mercenary kingdom."

 Yoraketche

Known languages

Ragamoll is the common tongue of New Crobuzon. It seems to be widely spoken throughout eastern Bas-Lag by members of all races. Likewise, Salt is the language of the Swollen Ocean, spoken by pirates, sailors and other maritime peoples. In The Scar, Salt is described as a patchwork language which borrows aspects from various other tongues, principally Ragamoll.

The anophelii maintain a written language called High Kettai, which is used by various scholars and publishing houses.  It is implied that high Kettai is inflected as it is known to possess an "ironic case." Base Kettai is High Kettai's more widely understood cousin.

Quiesy (also known as "Deadish") is the principal language of High Cromlech.  Since many of its speakers have either sewn-shut mouths or larynxes too decayed to form sounds properly, it consists of a series of coughing grunts, with "intricately timed pauses" that are as important as the spoken element.  It can also be "spoken" entirely soundlessly, with gestures or eye movements.

The khepri communicate through sign language and scented chemicals, since their insect-heads do not permit vocalization. They also maintain a written language called High Khepri.

The vodyanoi speak at least three different languages: the primary one being Lubbock and the others Fellid and Southern.  The traditional language of the Cactacae is Sunglari.  The garuda of the Cymek speak an unnamed language.  The people of Tesh, the people of Khadoh, the Salkrikaltor Cray, and the hotchi of the Rudewood all speak their own, eponymous languages.

Known races

Anophelii
Mosquito-like beings (singular Anophelius). The females look like scrawny human women, with huge paddle-like wings with which they fly after their prey. From their mouths they can extend a bony proboscis, which they stab into their prey to suck them dry. Female Anophelii are vicious, bloodthirsty and very dangerous except immediately after feeding, when they demonstrate an intelligence equal to that of the male sex. The males are short, stocky men that look no different from human men, aside from their sphincter-like mouths. Anophelii have now been confined to a single island, but once ruled much of the world in an empire called The Malarial Queendom. The threat of a resurgent Queendom is the cause of the strict quarantine around the Anophelii island.

Cactacae
Humanoid cacti. The Cactacae are enormous plant people, often towering over human beings. Although their young grow out of the ground, they nurse them as mammals do. Cactacae have sap for blood. They are known for their strength, and are often employed as laborers and bodyguards. Cactacae bodies are fibrous, with wooden bones, making them notoriously difficult to kill or wound with normal weapons; bullets pass nigh-harmlessly through them. The Cactacae community in New Crobuzon is based around and within a massive, dilapidated, greenhouse-like structure called The Glasshouse, and is allowed to exist as a nominally independent community within the city. Their weapons of choice are Rivebows, oversized crossbows that fire a spinning metal disc capable of shearing off Cactaceae limbs.

Cray
An aquatic race who look like humans from the waist up (with the exception of protruding gills behind the ears) and rock lobsters from the waist down. They use domesticated squids to hunt. Many live in an underwater city, Salkrikaltor, which rivals New Crobuzon itself in size.

Elementals
Beings that embody their respective elements. They are wild and mostly untameable, although the thaumaturges called elementarii (singular elementarius) specialize in summoning and unleashing them on their enemies. There are apparently elementals for a broad array of concepts and things: Iron Council mentions, among others, elementals of flesh, wood, glass and cement.

Garuda
The garuda are nomadic humanoid birds of prey. Most hail from the Cymek desert, where they live in tribes. They are hunters with a fierce sense of individualism. They resemble winged humans with avian heads and feet; their society is completely communist, with individual possessions seen as reducing the individual's freedom. A small ghetto of garuda live in New Crobuzon, and a few are described as living near the Cacotopic Stain in Iron Council. Garudan law is based around the principle of freedom of choice; all their crimes are forms of "choice-theft", denying another being the right to choose their own fate. Their name is derived from the Garuda of Hindu mythology.

Grindylow
A race of very powerful, mysterious, and sadistic fish-people (something between eels and viperfish) who appear in The Scar. Capable of survival in salt and fresh water, as well as in the air, they can communicate telepathically with a variety of aquatic species including whales and Cray. Their name comes from a creature of English nursery stories. Mieville's Grindylow bear a similarity to the Deep Ones of the Cthulhu Mythos. Grindylow use powerful shamanistic magic, the use of which can deform human users.

Handlingers
Sentient parasitic disembodied hands which control the mind of their host. There are two types: sinistrals, the noble caste, and dextriers, the soldier caste. When possessing a body, dextriers can use a number of supernatural abilities, including flight, fire-breathing, and enhanced strength. Dextriers and sinistrals typically pair up when engaging in scouting or combat; the sinistral has command of the pair while the dextrier performs most of the offensive actions.

Hotchi
According to Iron Council and several minor mentions throughout Perdido Street Station, the hotchi are a race of humanoid hedgehog people who ride a domesticated breed of giant rooster.

Humans
Humans are apparently the dominant race in New Crobuzon, and perhaps on Bas-Lag as well. They seem to be identical to their real world counterparts in most respects, except that many have the ability to use magic.

Khepri
The khepri are a race of humanoid scarab beetles. Female khepri possess bodies very similar to those of human women, except that their skin is crimson in colour and they possess large scarab beetles in place of heads. They communicate with each other via movements of their "headlegs" and squirts of chemicals. The female khepri are noted artists, using a biological excretion to sculpt breathtaking works of organic art. Male khepri, on the other hand, are lobster-sized, non-sentient scarabs, without the depending humanoid body. They mate by latching onto a female's head scarab and fertilizing her. Taken from the Egyptian god of the same name.

Scabmettler
Stocky, gray-skinned human-like beings whose blood, when shed, congeals immediately into a solid protective layer. Using a special herb which delays coagulation, the Scabmettlers are able to mold the blood into elaborate armor. They practice a unique form of martial, arena combat called mortu crutt, which emphasises pounding, hammer-like strikes, as edged weapons are nearly useless against them due to their rapid coagulation.

Stiltspear
Driven to near-extinction after the railroad destroyed their indigenous swamp lands, the Stiltspear were a race of quadrupedal creatures with insect-like legs and radially symmetrical hands that can be closed into spears, with which they hunt. They secrete thaumaturgons from their glands, which gives them the ability to camouflage themselves in the forest. They possess mystical abilities, including the ability to create golems through somaturgy, and can employ a chant-like singing to "unstick time", which aids in their hunting.

Strider
Striders, (known more formally as Borinatch) are a "proud race" whose bodies roughly resemble centaurs. However, their legs are as tall as an average human, and their faces resemble a cross between a baboon, insect, and wood-carving. They seem to live in small nomadic bands rather than cities, and these groups are led by a queen. Most notably, Striders seem to partially phase into and out of solid existence; said to be "dimensionally disrespectful," parts of their bodies may seem to vanish or not interact with ordinary matter in predictable ways.

Thanati
The thanati of High Cromlech are the overlords of the city, a caste of undead nobility.  Mieville describes them as "liches with sewn-shut mouths, with beautiful clothes and skin like preserved leather."

Vampir
The vampir are vampires, possessing great speed and strength, forked tongues, certain magical powers, and capable of living indefinitely. Vampirism on Bas-Lag is caused by a bacterium, and the technical term for the "disease" is photophobic haemophagy.

Vodyanoi
The vodyanoi are an aquatic people. They are fat and froglike, with webbed feet and toes. They are skilled in "watercraeft", water magics, able to fashion temporarily solid objects out of water. Vodyanoi ordinarily cannot survive out of water for more than a day, and do not swim in salt water. Taken from Russian folklore.

Weavers
Large, multidimensional spider-like beings who regard life on Bas-Lag as an ongoing work of art. They use their considerable powers to interfere with events according to their individual sense of aesthetics. Weavers speak in a disjointed, babbling flow of half-poetry, and are totally unpredictable.

Wyrmen
Wyrmen are semi-sentient flying creatures that look something like gargoyles. They are no more than a foot tall, with bright red skin and small bat wings. They are crude, vulgar, and laugh at anything and everything. They have a limited capacity for speech and are sometimes used by other races for reconnaissance and running errands.

Other races
Many races of Bas-Lag are only briefly mentioned in passing. The Llorgiss are a tri-faceted, barrel-shaped race. The Gessin are said to be large, and might wear armor. Menfish are some sort of newt/merman aquatic race. A reference is made to "crustaceans walking on two legs and cowled like monks, figures with too many eyes." A race of waist-high insect people were mentioned in Iron Council. The races "Vu-murt" and "Corokanth" were named, but the races were not described.

Remade
The Remade are usually, but not always, the victims of the criminal justice system. Rather than imprisoning criminals, the city of New Crobuzon will send them to punishment factories, where "bio-thaumaturges" warp and twist their bodies in a variety of ways. Some are combined with machines, to enslave them to one particular purpose. Others have bizarre limbs or organs grafted onto their bodies, making them freaks of nature. The Remade are primarily a sad, pathetic lot. However, some Remade, like the infamous Jack Half-A-Prayer, have used their remaking to their benefit, becoming vigilante heroes and styling themselves as "fReemade".

Science, technology and magic

The technology on Bas-Lag is wide and varied and evolves over the course of the books. In Perdido Street Station the primary piece of weaponry is the flintlock musket; by the time of Iron Council militia are armed with what appears to be percussion cap weaponry in the form of motorguns and pepperpot revolvers.

On pg. 229 of Perdido Street Station Isaac states: "That's where they dropped the colourbomb in 1545. That's what they said put an end to the Pirate Wars, but to be honest with you, Yag, they'd been over for a year before that [...]". In Iron Council, the science behind colourbombs is referred to as a "lost science."

Another power source is The Torque, mentioned on pg. 225, a mysterious energy plaguing the Cacotopic Stain that might be compared to radiation.  Torque leads to strange mutations, altering both living creatures and the inanimate environment: for example, during Iron Council, a railway carriage and its three occupants are transmogrified by the Torque into a blob of semi-solid matter containing three nuclei.  Another implication of dropping the colourbomb is that it was done to hide the extent of the torque weapon's devastation of city of Suroch, which later revealed to be the unnamed opponent in the Pirate Wars.

In all three novels there are also several mentions of clockwork gems, metaclockwork, sentient robot-like constructs operating with difference engines, and many other inexplicable or fantastic instances of science, magic and combination of both.

In Iron Council, Miéville dedicates a lot of attention to the magic art of golemancy, explaining the logic behind the art and its difference to the calling and control of elementals.

Further reading

References 

 
Fantasy worlds